In Unix operating systems, the term wheel refers to a user account with a wheel bit, a system setting that provides additional special system privileges that empower a user to execute restricted commands that ordinary user accounts cannot access.

Origins 
The term wheel was first applied to computer user privilege levels after the introduction of the TENEX operating system, later distributed under the name TOPS-20 in the 1960s and early 1970s.  The term was derived from the slang phrase big wheel, referring to a person with great power or influence.

In the 1980s, the term was imported into Unix culture due to the migration of operating system developers and users from TENEX/TOPS-20 to Unix.

Wheel group 
Modern Unix systems generally use user groups as a security protocol to control access privileges. The wheel group is a special user group used on some Unix systems, mostly BSD systems, to control access to the su or sudo command, which allows a user to masquerade as another user (usually the super user). Debian-like operating systems create a group called sudo with purpose similar to that of a wheel group.

Wheel war 
The phrase wheel war, which originated at Stanford University, is a term used in computer culture, first documented in the 1983 version of The Jargon File.  A 'wheel war' was a user conflict in a multi-user (see also: multiseat) computer system, in which students with administrative privileges would attempt to lock each other out of a university's computer system, sometimes causing unintentional harm to other users.

References 

Unix
Computer jargon